Edmonson County Schools is a public school district in Edmonson County, Kentucky, based in Brownsville.

Schools
The Edmonson County School District has two elementary schools, one school that houses 5th and 6th grade students, one middle school (which houses 7th and 8th grade students) and one high school.

Elementary schools
Kyrock Elementary School -- Sweeden
South Edmonson Elementary School -- Chalybeate

Middle schools
Edmonson County 5th and 6th Grade Center (5th and 6th grades) -- Brownsville
Edmonson County Middle School (7th and 8th grades) -- Brownsville

High schools
Edmonson County High School—Brownsville

Other
Edmonson County Alternative Learning Center (8-12)

Former schools

Preschools
Edmonson County Early Childhood Center -- housed at the original Brownsville Elementary until late 2000s; now used as a shopping plaza housing several local businesses

Elementary 

Brownsville Elementary School (1959-200?)
Sunfish Elementary School (1959-1979)

High schools
Asphalt School (19??-197?) 
Brownsville High School (1943-1959) 
Kyrock High School (1920?-1959) 
Sunfish High School (19??-1959)

Unspecified
Blanton School (19??-1959)
Chalybeate School
Wingfield School

References

External links
 Edmonson County Schools

School districts in Kentucky
Education in Edmonson County, Kentucky